Judge Reeves may refer to:

Albert L. Reeves (1873–1971), judge of the United States District Court for the Western District of Missouri
Carlton W. Reeves (born 1964), judge of the United States District Court for the Southern District of Mississippi
Danny C. Reeves (born 1957), judge of the United States District Court for the Eastern District of Kentucky
Pamela L. Reeves (1954–2020), judge of the United States District Court for the Eastern District of Tennessee

See also
Justice Reeves (disambiguation)